Franz Siegel Stadion, is an arena in Freiburg im Breisgau, Germany. It is primarily used for ice hockey, and is the home to the EHC Freiburg of the DEL 2. It opened in the late 1960s and holds 5,800 spectators.

References

Indoor arenas in Germany
Indoor ice hockey venues in Germany
Sport in Freiburg im Breisgau
Sports venues in Baden-Württemberg